Rupert Jee (born July 16, 1956) is an American entrepreneur and television celebrity who gained fame from his frequent appearances on Late Show with David Letterman, where he sometimes used the alter ego Kenny.  He first appeared on the Late Show during a "Meet the Neighbors" segment on September 20, 1993, and was a frequent accomplice of host David Letterman during the show's many comedic segments.

Jee holds a bachelor's degree in economics from the City University of New York.

He made an appearance on the January 7, 2016, episode of The Late Show with Stephen Colbert, marking his first and (as of 2022) only appearance on The Late Show following the retirement of David Letterman in 2015. On the day Colbert's team moved into the theatre, he renamed one of the deli's sandwiches in Colbert's honor, but as of 2022 the sandwich returned to its former name.

Hello Deli
Jee owns Hello Deli, which is located at 213 W 53rd St, adjacent to the Ed Sullivan Theatre where the Late Show is taped. His deli is one of the neighborhood's last remaining small businesses.

References

External links 
Official Hello Deli website

Businesspeople from New York City
Television personalities from New York City
American people of Chinese descent
1956 births
Living people
Baruch College alumni